Nationality words link to articles with information on the nation's poetry or literature (for instance, Irish or France).

Events

Works published

England
Richard Barnfield:
 The Encomium of Lady Pecunia; or, The Praise of Money
 Poems in Divers Humours
 Nicholas Breton, A Solemne Passion of the Soules Love
 Richard Carew, published anonymously, A Herrings Tale
 George Chapman:
 Seven Bookes of the Iliades of Homere, Prince of Poets, contains books 1–2, 7–9 (see also Achilles Shield 1598, Homer Prince of Poets 1609, The Iliads of Homer 1611, Homers Odysses 1614, Twenty-four Bookes of Homers Odisses 1615, The Whole Workes of Homer 1616)
 Achilles Shield
 Thomas Churchyard, A Wished Reformacion of Wicked Rebellion (expanded in 1611 as Queen Anna's New World of Words)
 Everard Guilpin, published anonymously, Skialetheia. Or, A Shadow of Truth, in Certaine Epigrams or Satyres
 Christopher Marlowe, Hero and Leander, published posthumously and completed by George Chapman (who divided the poem into two sestiads and adding four more written by Chapman himself); described as "this unfinished Tragedy", yet possibly considered complete by Marlowe
 John Marston:
 The Metamorphosis of Pigmalians Image
 The Scourge of Villanie, published under the pen name "William Kinsayder"
 Francis Meres, Palladis Tamia. Wits Treasury, valued for its inclusion of a list of plays by Shakespeare and also a mention that Shakespeare's "sugar'd sonnets" are circulating privately; the second in the "Wits Series" (see also Ling, Politeuphuia 1597; Allot, Wits Theater 1599; Wrednot, Palladis Palatium 1604)
 Francis Rous, Thule; or, Vertues Historie Sir Philip Sidney, Arcadia, a corrected version of the poem which had originally appeared in a pirated version in 1593, although even this version was not completely free from error. It was prepared under the supervision of his sister, the Countess of Pembroke; in the same volume appeared Astrophel and Stella, also originally published (posthumously) twice in 1593 (first from an unauthorized, corrupt text and in an unauthorized corrected version). Sources differ on the publishing year of this edition, with The Concise Oxford Chronology of English Literature giving "circa 1597", and other sources, including, Mona Wilson, stating this year.
 Thomas Speght, The Workes of our Antient and Lerned English Poet, Geffrey Chaucer, Newly Printed 
 Joshua Sylvester, The Second Weeke or Childhood of the World, the first part of Sylvester's translation of Guillaume de Salluste Du Bartas
 Robert Tofte:
  , translated from Matteo Maria Boiardo's Other languages
 Jean de Sponde, Amours; publication year uncertain; France
 Torquato Tasso, Le sette giornate, Italy
 Lope de Vega, Spain:
 La Arcadia La Dragontea'', an epic poem about Sir Francis Drake

Births
Death years link to the corresponding "[year] in poetry" article:
 March 12 – Guillaume Colletet (died 1659), French
 August 7 – Georg Stiernhielm (died 1672), Swedish civil servant, linguist and poet
Also – Johann George Moeresius (died 1657), Polish poet and rector

Deaths
Birth years link to the corresponding "[year] in poetry" article:
 January 9 – Jasper Heywood (died 1535) English Jesuit, poet and translator
 June 1 – Thomas Preston (born 1537), English poet and perhaps playwright, a master of Trinity Hall, Cambridge
 August – Alexander Montgomerie (born 1550), Scottish Catholic courtier and poet
 Also – Henri Estienne (born 1528), French philologist, poet and humanist

See also

 Poetry
 16th century in poetry
 16th century in literature
 Dutch Renaissance and Golden Age literature
 Elizabethan literature
 English Madrigal School
 French Renaissance literature
 Renaissance literature
 Spanish Renaissance literature
 University Wits

Notes

16th-century poetry
Poetry